Lea-Francis was a British motor manufacturing company that began by building bicycles.

History

R. H. Lea and G. I. Francis started the business in Coventry in 1895. They branched out into car manufacturing in 1903 and motorcycles in 1911. Lea-Francis built cars under licence for the Singer company. In 1919, they started to build their own cars from bought-in components.

From 1922, Lea-Francis formed a business relationship with Vulcan of Southport sharing manufacturing and dealers. Vulcan supplied bodies to Lea-Francis and in return got gearboxes and steering gear. Two six-cylinder Vulcan-designed and manufactured cars were marketed as Lea-Francis 14/40 and 16/60 as well as Vulcans. The association ended in 1928 when Vulcan stopped making cars.

A sporting image began to appear from about 1925, leading to models such as the Hyper and the Ace of Spades. The Hyper, also called the S-type, was the first British supercharged production car with a 1.5 litre Meadows engine, and in 1928 a Lea-Francis Hyper won the Ulster TT, a 30-lap race on the  Ards circuit on the roads of Northern Ireland in the hands of legendary race car driver Kaye Don. The race was watched by a record 250,000 spectators and the victory placed Lea-Francis firmly on the map.

The company was re-formed in 1937 under the chairmanship of George Leek with other ex-Riley Motor men such as R.H. Rose who designed a new engine for Lea-Francis having a similar layout to the Riley 12/4. The 12 hp and the 14 hp (actually 12.9 hp) were introduced in 1937 and continued until the start of the war in 1939 when production ceased and the factory concentrated on manufacturing for the war effort.

Post-war car production commenced in 1946 with updated vehicles based on the pre-war designs. The 14 hp Saloon and Sports were luxurious and sporty vehicles and were popular, if expensive. Eventually, an improved chassis with independent front suspension and hydraulic brakes was introduced across the range and in 1950 the 18 h.p. saloon and 2½ litre Sports, both with the more powerful 2.5 litre engine, were introduced. Production once again came to a halt in 1954 after not having been present at Earl's Court since 1952.

A number of 14 hp Sports chassis were sold to Connaught Engineering where they became the L2 and L3 sports-racing cars. Connaught developed a Formula 2 racing engine for their "A" type single seater which was based on the Lea-Francis design.

The company had a chequered history with some notable motorcycles and cars but financial difficulties surfaced on a regular basis. The Hillfields site was abandoned in 1937 when it was sold by the receiver and a new company, under a slightly different name, moved to Much Park Street in Coventry. It survived there until 1962 when the company finally closed.

The Lynx, a tube-framed 2+2 roadster with a Ford Zephyr 2.6 litre inline-six engine, was the final model produced by Lea-Francis. Unveiled at the October 1960 British Motor show, it was famously painted in mauve with gold trim. The model remained in prototype form and only 3 Lynx cars were made as no production was started due to lack of demand.

A total of almost 10,000 Lea-Francis vehicles were made until production ceased due to the Lynx's failure to capture the buying public's attention. By the time of the Lynx's launch, Lea-Francis was so financially distressed that they could not afford to build Lynxes unless they had been pre-ordered, and as none were, only three prototypes were made. Lea-Francis also dallied into starting production of the Fuldamobil Nobel bubble car to keep busy but it proved a frivolous plan and had competition from the famous Mini that was introduced in the late 1950s. More serious work was undertaken when a new prototype was built for a possible brand new saloon using a Chrysler V8 engine but the project remained unfinished. 
The motor manufacturing parts of the company passed into the hands of the receiver in 1962, leaving Lea-Francis to continue with their engineering business. The company's material assets were purchased by Quinton Hazell Ltd., a motor vehicle component manufacturer, while the Lea-Francis name was purchased by English entrepreneur Barrie Price at about the same time.

In 1976 Barrie Price began work on a hand made new car which was to be an expensive Lea-Francis Nostalgia type tourer powered by a Jaguar running gear, recalling the same cars Lea-Francis was known for in the 1930s. Price's firm, A.B.PRICE LIMITED, has continued to provide service and spares for the surviving cars since 1980 and has also built a number of retro Lea-Francis modern motor cars to special order, reviving the "Ace of Spades" name to their unique hand built model. These have a handsome aluminium body shell composed of a number of U.K.-made components, being produced as a two-seat coupé and a convertible. Both versions are powered by Jaguar Cars mechanicals and are produced at an average of 12-14 cars annually with a price tag at 20000 GBP according to motorbook author and writer G.N. Georgano.
A.B. Price sold Lea-Francis Ltd. and all its assets in July 2019.

Lea-Francis car models

Lea-Francis Owners' Club

The Lea-Francis Owners' Club has an ever-growing membership of around 340 members who own around 420 vehicles.

Revival

In 1998 it was believed that the Lea-Francis name might yet be seen again on the road when a new Lea-Francis sports car by the name of the 30/230, designed by James Randle, was shown at the Motor Show. Only a prototype was built before the project had to be abandoned.

Gallery

References
Citations

Bibliography

Further reading

External links

Lea Francis Owners' Club website

Defunct motor vehicle manufacturers of England
Coventry motor companies